The Champlain Flyer was a commuter train service in Vermont that ran from 2000 to 2003 between Burlington, South Burlington, Shelburne, and Charlotte, in the eastern Champlain Valley. The Vermont Railway operated the  route along the former main line of the Rutland Railroad.

History

The Champlain Flyer was conceived as an alternate transportation option during the reconstruction of U.S. Route 7. It benefited from public funds earmarked for public transportation.

The train began operation on December 4, 2000, with two daily round-trips, with plans to operate as many as ten. Startup costs were $18 million ($ in  adjusted for inflation), most of which were provided by the federal government for improving the tracks and grade crossings along the route. At the time of its inception, it was the shortest commuter rail system in the United States.

Initial ridership figures were lower than expected as the highway reconstruction project was delayed. In 2002, it was threatened to be cut from the state budget. The newly elected Gov. Jim Douglas (who succeeded Gov. Howard Dean of Shelburne) decided that the train was not viable, and the last train ran on February 28, 2003, despite all contracts being pre-paid through the end of the year.

Later service

The Vermont Railway has periodically operated an excursion train service from Burlington to Charlotte and back known as the Champlain Valley Flyer.

Regular passenger service returned to Burlington Union Station in July 2022, when Amtrak extended the Ethan Allen Express north from Rutland. The train uses the former route of the Champlain Flyer, but does not serve any of its former stations except Burlington. The Vermont Agency of Transportation has raised the possibility of adding an infill stop in Shelburne, where the Champlain Flyer platform still exists.

Operations

The service's rolling stock consisted of a rebuilt Vermont Railway GP38-2 and ten ex-Virginia Railway Express de-motored RDC cars. Two of these cars were outfitted with cab control. Fares were $1 for a one-way trip, collected on the honor system by being deposited in a box upon entering the train.

References

External links
Pictures of the Champlain Flyer

Passenger rail transportation in Vermont
Former United States regional rail systems
Railway services introduced in 2000
Railway services discontinued in 2003